Jeffrey Alan Morrison (born February 4, 1979) is a retired American professional tennis player.

Morrison was the last American male left in the singles draw at Wimbledon in 2002, going on to defeat future World No. 1 Juan Carlos Ferrero en route to the third round.

Morrison attended the University of Florida in Gainesville, Florida, where he played for the Florida Gators men's tennis team in National Collegiate Athletics Association (NCAA) competition.  He defeated James Blake of Harvard University in the NCAA Singles National Championship final in 1999.  Morrison was a two-time All-American during his sophomore and junior seasons.  He was inducted into the University of Florida Athletic Hall of Fame as a "Gator Great" in 2012.

During his career, Morrison won three Challenger events and reached as high as World No. 85 in singles and World No. 81 in doubles (both in the summer of 2002).

Performance timelines

Singles

Doubles

ATP career finals

Doubles: 1 (1 runner-up)

ATP Challenger and ITF Futures finals

Singles: 11 (4–7)

Doubles: 16 (11–5)

See also 

 Florida Gators
 List of Florida Gators tennis players
 List of University of Florida Athletic Hall of Fame members

References

External links 
 
 

1979 births
Living people
American male tennis players
Florida Gators men's tennis players
Sportspeople from Huntington, West Virginia
Tennis people from West Virginia
Tennis players at the 2003 Pan American Games
Pan American Games medalists in tennis
Pan American Games bronze medalists for the United States
Medalists at the 2003 Pan American Games